The following is a partial list of notable residents, past and present, from Broughty Ferry; a suburb of Dundee in Scotland.

Journalism
Alan Cochrane, journalist
James Meek, journalist

Media
Hamish Clark, actor
Lorraine Kelly, television broadcaster
Heather Ripley, actress 
David Robertson, television broadcaster
Barry Keoghan, actor

Music
Roger Ball, musician
Ricky Ross, musician
Duncan Brown (musician)

Military
Hugh Malcolm, Victoria Cross recipient
Alistair Urquhart, soldier and businessman

Politics
Isabella Carrie, suffragist
Douglas Craig, businessman and Conservative politician
Frances Josephy, Liberal politician
Lewis Moonie, Labour politician
Charles Ritchie, 1st Baron Ritchie of Dundee, Conservative politician and Chancellor of the Exchequer
George Thomson, Labour and later Liberal Democrat politician

Law
Colin Campbell, lawyer
Sir Thomas Winsor, lawyer, economic regulator and police reformer

Religion
Robert Breaden, church minister
Francis Bridger, church minister
James Denney, theologian and preacher
Thomas Dick, preacher and scientist
Fraser McLuskey, Church of Scotland Minister
Gordon Webster Free Church minister and later Moderator of the Presbyterian Church of New Zealand

Sports
David Brown, football player
Joe Buick, football player
Sir George Cunningham, rugby union player and colonial administrator
Fred Erentz, football player
Alistair Gunn, football player
Pat Harrower, rugby union player
Jackie Knight, cricketer and football player
Jim McLean, football player and manager
Gibson McNaughton, football player and manager
Fraser Milligan, football player
Frank Munro, football player
Iain Phillip, football player
Davie Robb, football player
Richard Sale, cricketer
Bobby Seith, football player and manager
George Sievwright, football player and manager

Other

David Blair, Titanic crew member
Pamela Butchart, teacher and children's author
William Cruikshank, painter
John Glenday, poet
Janet Greig, anaesthetist
Sir Francis Mudie, colonial administrator
George Peden, historian
Thomas Smith, lighthouse engineer
Dudley D. Watkins, Comic Artist
Leo Baxendale, Cartoonist

References

Broughty Ferry
 
Broughty Ferry people
Broughty Ferry